Schodowski (feminine: Schodowska, plural: Schodowscy) is a Polish surname. Notable people with the name include:

 Chuck Schodowski (born 1934), late-night horror hosts of The Big Chuck and Lil' John Show
 Jack Schodowski, Shelving, Inc. founder
  (born 1987), Polish handball player
 Michelle Schodowski Capra, character from Northern Exposure
 Stanley S. Schodowski, 1991 New Jersey Inventors Hall of Fame
 Zbigniew Schodowski (born 1987), Polish rower
Polish-language surnames